The year 2022 is reckoned as year 2565 in the Buddhist Era. The year is marked by anticipated APEC meetings, the first Bangkok governor election after the 2014 coup, and raising inflation following COVID-19 pandemic in the country.

Incumbents
 King: Vajiralongkorn 
 Prime Minister: Prayut Chan-o-cha
 Supreme Patriarch: Ariyavongsagatanana (Amborn Ambaro)

Events

Ongoing events 
 COVID-19 pandemic in Thailand

January-March 
 Early January – Pork prices in Thailand's wet markets rise to 210-250 Bahts per kilogramme, the highest in years.
 10 January – Park rangers at Thong Pha Phum National Park in Kanchanaburi discovers 2 Tiger carcasses at a campsite in the park.
 16 January 
 COVID-19 pandemic in Thailand: Thailand reports first death from Omicron variant.
 By-elections were held at Songkhla and Chumphon, with Democrat party gaining victory at both provinces.
 25 January – Thailand's Prime Minister makes an official 2-day visit to Saudi Arabia at the invite of the Crown Prince of Saudi Arabia. Marking the first high-level visit between the 2 countries in three decades 
30 January – By-elections were held at Bangkok's constituency 9 (Lak Si - Chatuchak), with Pheu Thai Party gaining victory.

April-June 
 22 May – Chadchart Sittipunt, former Transport minister, won the 2022 Bangkok gubernatorial election.

July-September 
 5 August – Mountain B nightclub fire
 24 August – Prayut Chan-o-cha was suspended from prime ministerial duties by the Constitutional Court of Thailand while it considered legal challenges on his term limit.
 30 September – The Constitutional Court ruled that the eight-year term limit for Prayut's premiership dates from the promulgation of the 2017 constitution and not his assumption of the position after the 2014 coup.

October-December 
 6 October - 2022 Nong Bua Lamphu massacre
 16-19 November - APEC Summit 2022
 19 December – Sinking of the Royal Thai Navy HTMS Sukhothai with 106 crew aboard, 31 missing.

Deaths

January 
 8 January – Sornphet Sornsuphan, Luk Thung singer
 12 January – Waiphot Phetsuphan, Luk Thung singer

February 
 24 February - Nida Patcharaveerapong, actress

References 

2022 in Thailand
Thailand
Thailand
2020s in Thailand
Years of the 21st century in Thailand